Willy Polleunis (born 27 December 1947) is a retired long-distance runner from Belgium who won the silver medal in the 3000 metres at the 1973 European Indoor Championships, behind his clubmate Emiel Puttemans. He competed in the 5000 and 10000 metres events at the 1968, 1972 and 1976 Olympics with the best achievement of sixth place in the 5000 metres in 1976. At the start of the final lap, he was in tenth place, but he accelerated, and possibly ran the final lap even faster than the winner, Lasse Viren.

References

1947 births
Living people
Belgian male long-distance runners
Athletes (track and field) at the 1968 Summer Olympics
Athletes (track and field) at the 1972 Summer Olympics
Athletes (track and field) at the 1976 Summer Olympics
Olympic athletes of Belgium
Sportspeople from Hasselt